This is a list of the bird species recorded in Uganda. The avifauna of Uganda included a total of 1090 confirmed species as of February 2023. Of them, one is endemic, and three have been introduced by humans. Three additional species are hypothetical as defined below and are not included in the counts. Unless otherwise noted, the list is that of Avibase.

This list's taxonomic treatment (designation and sequence of orders, families and species) and nomenclature (English and scientific names) are those of The Clements Checklist of Birds of the World, 2022 edition.

The following tags highlight several categories of occurrence other than regular migrants and residents.

 (A) Accidental - a species that rarely or accidentally occurs in Uganda (also called a vagrant)
 (E) Endemic - a species endemic to Uganda
 (I) Introduced - a species introduced to Uganda as a consequence, direct or indirect, of human actions
 (H) Hypothetical - a species possibly present but which has not been documented

Ostriches
Order: StruthioniformesFamily: Struthionidae

Ostriches are flightless birds native to Africa, and the largest living species of bird. They are distinctive in appearance, with a long neck and legs and the ability to run at high speeds.

Common ostrich, Struthio camelus

Ducks, geese, and waterfowl

Order: AnseriformesFamily: Anatidae

Anatidae includes the ducks and most duck-like waterfowl, such as geese and swans. These birds are adapted to an aquatic existence with webbed feet, flattened bills, and feathers that are excellent at shedding water due to an oily coating.

White-faced whistling-duck, Dendrocygna viduata
Fulvous whistling-duck, Dendrocygna bicolor
White-backed duck, Thalassornis leuconotus
Knob-billed duck, Sarkidiornis melanotos
Hartlaub's duck, Pteronetta hartlaubii (A)
Egyptian goose, Alopochen aegyptiacus
Spur-winged goose, Plectropterus gambensis
African pygmy-goose, Nettapus auritus
Garganey, Spatula querquedula
Blue-billed teal, Spatula hottentota
Northern shoveler, Spatula clypeata
Eurasian wigeon, Mareca penelope (A)
African black duck, Anas sparsa
Yellow-billed duck, Anas undulata
Red-billed duck, Anas erythrorhyncha
Northern pintail, Anas acuta
Green-winged teal, Anas crecca
Southern pochard, Netta erythrophthalma
Common pochard, Aythya ferina
Ferruginous duck, Aythya nyroca (A)
Tufted duck, Aythya fuligula
Maccoa duck, Oxyura maccoa (A)

Guineafowl

Order: GalliformesFamily: Numididae

Guineafowl are a group of African, seed-eating, ground-nesting birds that resemble partridges, but with featherless heads and spangled grey plumage.

Helmeted guineafowl, Numida meleagris
Western crested guineafowl, Guttera verreauxi

New World quail
Order: GalliformesFamily: Odontophoridae

Despite their family's common name, these two species are native to Africa.

Stone partridge, Ptilopachus petrosus
Nahan's francolin, Ptilopachus nahani

Pheasants, grouse, and allies

Order: GalliformesFamily: Phasianidae

The Phasianidae are a family of terrestrial birds which consists of quails, snowcocks, francolins, spurfowls, tragopans, monals, pheasants, peafowls, and jungle fowls. In general, they are plump (although they vary in size) and have broad, relatively short wings.

Latham's francolin, Peliperdix lathami
Crested francolin, Ortygornis sephaena
Coqui francolin, Campocolinus coqui
Ring-necked francolin, Scleroptila streptophorus
Red-winged francolin, Scleroptila levaillantii
Elgon francolin, Scleroptila elgonensis
Orange River francolin, Scleroptila gutturalis
Shelley's francolin, Scleroptila shelleyi
Blue quail, Synoicus adansonii
Common quail, Coturnix coturnix 
Harlequin quail, Coturnix delegorguei
Handsome francolin, Pternistis nobilis
Jackson's francolin, Pternistis jacksoni (A)
Hildebrandt's francolin, Pternistis hildebrandti
Scaly francolin, Pternistis squamatus
Heuglin's francolin, Pternistis icterorhynchus
Clapperton's francolin, Pternistis clappertoni
Yellow-necked francolin, Pternistis leucoscepus
Red-necked francolin, Pternistis afer

Flamingos

Order: PhoenicopteriformesFamily: Phoenicopteridae

Flamingos filter-feed on shellfish and algae. Their oddly shaped beaks are specially adapted to separate mud and silt from the food they consume and, uniquely, are used upside-down.

Greater flamingo, Phoenicopterus roseus
Lesser flamingo, Phoeniconaias minor

Grebes

Order: PodicipediformesFamily: Podicipedidae

Grebes are small to medium-large freshwater diving birds. They have lobed toes and are excellent swimmers and divers. However, they have their feet placed far back on the body, making them quite ungainly on land.

Little grebe, Tachybaptus ruficollis
Great crested grebe, Podiceps cristatus
Eared grebe, Podiceps nigricollis (A)

Pigeons and doves

Order: ColumbiformesFamily: Columbidae

Pigeons and doves are stout-bodied birds with short necks and short slender bills with a fleshy cere.

Rock pigeon, Columba livia (I)
Speckled pigeon, Columba guinea
Afep pigeon, Columba unicincta
Rameron pigeon, Columba arquatrix
Delegorgue's pigeon, Columba delegorguei
Bronze-naped pigeon, Columba iriditorques
Lemon dove, Columba larvata
White-naped pigeon, Columba albinucha
European turtle-dove, Streptopelia turtur
Dusky turtle-dove, Streptopelia lugens
Mourning collared-dove, Streptopelia decipiens
Red-eyed dove, Streptopelia semitorquata
Ring-necked dove, Streptopelia capicola
Vinaceous dove, Streptopelia vinacea
Laughing dove, Streptopelia senegalensis
Emerald-spotted wood-dove, Turtur chalcospilos
Black-billed wood-dove, Turtur abyssinicus
Blue-spotted wood-dove, Turtur afer
Tambourine dove, Turtur tympanistria
Namaqua dove, Oena capensis
Bruce's green-pigeon, Treron waalia
African green-pigeon, Treron calvus

Sandgrouse
Order: PterocliformesFamily: Pteroclidae

Sandgrouse have small, pigeon-like heads and necks, but sturdy compact bodies. They have long pointed wings and sometimes tails and a fast direct flight. Flocks fly to watering holes at dawn and dusk. Their legs are feathered down to the toes.

Lichtenstein's sandgrouse, Pterocles lichtensteinii (A)
Four-banded sandgrouse, Pterocles quadricinctus

Bustards

Order: OtidiformesFamily: Otididae

Bustards are large terrestrial birds mainly associated with dry open country and steppes in the Old World. They are omnivorous and nest on the ground. They walk steadily on strong legs and big toes, pecking for food as they go. They have long broad wings with "fingered" wingtips and striking patterns in flight. Many have interesting mating displays.

Kori bustard, Ardeotis kori
Denham's bustard, Neotis denhami
White-bellied bustard, Eupodotis senegalensis
Buff-crested bustard, Lophotis gindiana
Black-bellied bustard, Lissotis melanogaster
Hartlaub's bustard, Lissotis hartlaubii

Turacos

Order: MusophagiformesFamily: Musophagidae

The turacos, plantain-eaters, and go-away-birds make up the bird family Musophagidae. They are medium-sized arboreal birds. The turacos and plantain-eaters are brightly coloured, usually in blue, green, or purple. The go-away-birds are mostly grey and white.

Great blue turaco, Corythaeola cristata
Black-billed turaco, Tauraco schuettii
White-crested turaco, Tauraco leucolophus
Hartlaub's turaco, Tauraco hartlaubi
Purple-crested turaco, Tauraco porphyreolophus
Rwenzori turaco, Ruwenzorornis johnstoni
Ross's turaco, Musophaga rossae
Bare-faced go-away-bird, Corythaixoides personatus
White-bellied go-away-bird, Corythaixoides leucogaster
Eastern plantain-eater, Crinifer zonurus

Cuckoos

Order: CuculiformesFamily: Cuculidae

The family Cuculidae includes cuckoos, roadrunners, and anis. These birds are of variable size with slender bodies, long tails, and strong legs. The Old World cuckoos are brood parasites.

Black-throated coucal, Centropus leucogaster
Senegal coucal, Centropus senegalensis
Blue-headed coucal, Centropus monachus
White-browed coucal, Centropus superciliosus
Black coucal, Centropus grillii
Blue malkoha, Ceuthmochares aereus
Green malkoha, Ceuthmochares australis
Great spotted cuckoo, Clamator glandarius
Levaillant's cuckoo, Clamator levaillantii
Pied cuckoo, Clamator jacobinus
Thick-billed cuckoo, Pachycoccyx audeberti (A)
Dideric cuckoo, Chrysococcyx caprius
Klaas's cuckoo, Chrysococcyx klaas
Yellow-throated cuckoo, Chrysococcyx flavigularis
African emerald cuckoo, Chrysococcyx cupreus
Dusky long-tailed cuckoo, Cercococcyx mechowi
Olive long-tailed cuckoo, Cercococcyx olivinus
Barred long-tailed cuckoo, Cercococcyx montanus
Black cuckoo, Cuculus clamosus
Red-chested cuckoo, Cuculus solitarius
Lesser cuckoo, Cuculus poliocephalus
African cuckoo, Cuculus gularis
Madagascar cuckoo, Cuculus rochii (A)
Common cuckoo, Cuculus canorus

Nightjars and allies
Order: CaprimulgiformesFamily: Caprimulgidae

Nightjars are medium-sized nocturnal birds that usually nest on the ground. They have long wings, short legs, and very short bills. Most have small feet, of little use for walking, and long pointed wings. Their soft plumage is camouflaged to resemble bark or leaves.

Pennant-winged nightjar, Caprimulgus vexillarius
Standard-winged nightjar, Caprimulgus longipennis
Eurasian nightjar, Caprimulgus europaeus
Sombre nightjar, Caprimulgus fraenatus (A)
Nubian nightjar, Caprimulgus nubicus
Fiery-necked nightjar, Caprimulgus pectoralis
Montane nightjar, Caprimulgus poliocephalus
Swamp nightjar, Caprimulgus natalensis
Plain nightjar, Caprimulgus inornatus
Star-spotted nightjar, Caprimulgus stellatus
Freckled nightjar, Caprimulgus tristigma
Bates's nightjar, Caprimulgus batesi
Long-tailed nightjar, Caprimulgus climacurus
Slender-tailed nightjar, Caprimulgus clarus
Square-tailed nightjar, Caprimulgus fossii

Swifts

Order: CaprimulgiformesFamily: Apodidae

Swifts are small birds which spend the majority of their lives flying. These birds have very short legs and never settle voluntarily on the ground, perching instead only on vertical surfaces. Many swifts have long swept-back wings which resemble a crescent or boomerang.

Mottled spinetail, Telacanthura ussheri
Sabine's spinetail, Rhaphidura sabini
Cassin's spinetail, Neafrapus cassini
Scarce swift, Schoutedenapus myoptilus
Alpine swift, Apus melba
Mottled swift, Apus aequatorialis
Common swift, Apus apus
Nyanza swift, Apus niansae
Pallid swift, Apus pallidus (A)
African swift, Apus barbatus
Little swift, Apus affinis
Horus swift, Apus horus
White-rumped swift, Apus caffer
African palm-swift, Cypsiurus parvus

Flufftails
Order: GruiformesFamily: Sarothruridae

The flufftails are a small family of ground-dwelling birds found only in Madagascar and sub-Saharan Africa.

White-spotted flufftail, Sarothrura pulchra
Buff-spotted flufftail, Sarothrura elegans
Red-chested flufftail, Sarothrura rufa

Rails, gallinules, and coots

Order: GruiformesFamily: Rallidae

Rallidae is a large family of small to medium-sized birds which includes the rails, crakes, coots, and gallinules. Typically they inhabit dense vegetation in damp environments near lakes, swamps, or rivers. In general they are shy and secretive birds, making them difficult to observe. Most species have strong legs and long toes which are well adapted to soft uneven surfaces. They tend to have short, rounded wings and to be weak fliers.

African rail, Rallus caerulescens
Corn crake, Crex crex
African crake, Crex egregia
Gray-throated rail, Canirallus oculeus
Spotted crake, Porzana porzana (A)
Lesser moorhen, Paragallinula angulata
Eurasian moorhen, Gallinula chloropus
Red-knobbed coot, Fulica cristata
Allen's gallinule, Porphyrio alleni
African swamphen, Porphyrio madagascariensis
Nkulengu rail, Himantornis haematopus
Striped crake, Amaurornis marginalis (A)
Black crake, Zapornia flavirostra
Little crake, Zapornia parva (A)
Baillon's crake, Zapornia pusilla (A)

Finfoots

Order: GruiformesFamily: Heliornithidae

Heliornithidae is a small family of tropical birds with webbed lobes on their feet similar to those of grebes and coots.

African finfoot, Podica senegalensis

Cranes

Order: GruiformesFamily: Gruidae

Cranes are large, long-legged and long-necked birds. Unlike the similar-looking but unrelated herons, cranes fly with necks outstretched, not pulled back. Most have elaborate and noisy courting displays or "dances".

Gray crowned-crane, Balearica regulorum
Black crowned-crane, Balearica pavonina (A)

Thick-knees
Order: CharadriiformesFamily: Burhinidae

The thick-knees are a group of waders found worldwide within the tropical zone, with some species also breeding in temperate Europe and Australia. They are medium to large waders with strong black or yellow-black bills, large yellow eyes, and cryptic plumage. Despite being classed as waders, most species have a preference for arid or semi-arid habitats.

Water thick-knee, Burhinus vermiculatus
Eurasian thick-knee, Burhinus oedicnemus (A)
Indian thick-knee, Burhinus indicus
Senegal thick-knee, Burhinus senegalensis
Spotted thick-knee, Burhinus capensis

Egyptian plover
Order: CharadriiformesFamily: Pluvianidae

The Egyptian plover is found across equatorial Africa and along the Nile River.

Egyptian plover, Pluvianus aegyptius (A)

Stilts and avocets
Order: CharadriiformesFamily: Recurvirostridae

Recurvirostridae is a family of large wading birds which includes the avocets and stilts. The avocets have long legs and long up-curved bills. The stilts have extremely long legs and long, thin, straight bills.

Black-winged stilt, Himantopus himantopus
Pied avocet, Recurvirostra avosetta

Oystercatchers
Order: CharadriiformesFamily: Haematopodidae

The oystercatchers are large and noisy plover-like birds with strong bills used for smashing or prising open molluscs.

Eurasian oystercatcher, Haematopus ostralegus

Plovers and lapwings
Order: CharadriiformesFamily: Charadriidae

The family Charadriidae includes the plovers, dotterels, and lapwings. They are small to medium-sized birds with compact bodies, short thick necks, and long, usually pointed, wings. They are found in open country worldwide, mostly in habitats near water.

Black-bellied plover, Pluvialis squatarola
Pacific golden-plover, Pluvialis fulva (A)
Long-toed lapwing, Vanellus crassirostris
Spur-winged plover, Vanellus spinosus
Black-headed lapwing, Vanellus tectus
White-headed lapwing, Vanellus albiceps (A)
Senegal lapwing, Vanellus lugubris
Crowned lapwing, Vanellus coronatus
Wattled lapwing, Vanellus senegallus
Brown-chested lapwing, Vanellus superciliosus
Lesser sand-plover, Charadrius mongolus (A)
Greater sand-plover, Charadrius leschenaultii (A)
Caspian plover, Charadrius asiaticus
Kittlitz's plover, Charadrius pecuarius
Kentish plover, Charadrius alexandrinus (A)
Common ringed plover, Charadrius hiaticula
Little ringed plover, Charadrius dubius
Three-banded plover, Charadrius tricollaris
Forbes's plover, Charadrius forbesi (A)
White-fronted plover, Charadrius marginatus

Painted-snipes

Order: CharadriiformesFamily: Rostratulidae

Painted-snipes are short-legged, long-billed birds similar in shape to the true snipes, but more brightly coloured.

Greater painted-snipe, Rostratula benghalensis

Jacanas
Order: CharadriiformesFamily: Jacanidae

The jacanas are a group of waders found throughout the tropics. They are identifiable by their huge feet and claws which enable them to walk on floating vegetation in the shallow lakes that are their preferred habitat.

Lesser jacana, Microparra capensis
African jacana, Actophilornis africanus

Sandpipers and allies
Order: CharadriiformesFamily: Scolopacidae

Scolopacidae is a large diverse family of small to medium-sized shorebirds including the sandpipers, curlews, godwits, shanks, tattlers, woodcocks, snipes, dowitchers, and phalaropes. The majority of these species eat small invertebrates picked out of the mud or soil. Variation in length of legs and bills enables multiple species to feed in the same habitat, particularly on the coast, without direct competition for food.

Whimbrel, Numenius phaeopus
Eurasian curlew, Numenius arquata
Bar-tailed godwit, Limosa lapponica (A)
Black-tailed godwit, Limosa limosa
Ruddy turnstone, Arenaria interpres
Ruff, Calidris pugnax
Broad-billed sandpiper, Calidris falcinellus (A)
Curlew sandpiper, Calidris ferruginea
Temminck's stint, Calidris temminckii
Sanderling, Calidris alba
Dunlin, Calidris alpina (A)
Little stint, Calidris minuta
Pectoral sandpiper, Calidris melanotos (A)
Jack snipe, Lymnocryptes minimus
Great snipe, Gallinago media
Common snipe, Gallinago gallinago
African snipe, Gallinago nigripennis
Terek sandpiper, Xenus cinereus
Red-necked phalarope, Phalaropus lobatus (A)
Common sandpiper, Actitis hypoleucos
Green sandpiper, Tringa ochropus
Spotted redshank, Tringa erythropus
Common greenshank, Tringa nebularia
Lesser yellowlegs, Tringa flavipes (A)
Marsh sandpiper, Tringa stagnatilis
Wood sandpiper, Tringa glareola
Common redshank, Tringa totanus

Buttonquails
Order: CharadriiformesFamily: Turnicidae

The buttonquails are small, drab, running birds which resemble the true quails. The female is the brighter of the sexes and initiates courtship. The male incubates the eggs and tends the young.

Small buttonquail, Turnix sylvaticus
Black-rumped buttonquail, Turnix nanus
Quail-plover, Ortyxelos meiffrenii (A)

Pratincoles and coursers
Order: CharadriiformesFamily: Glareolidae

Glareolidae is a family of wading birds comprising the pratincoles, which have short legs, long pointed wings, and long forked tails, and the coursers, which have long legs, short wings, and long, pointed bills which curve downwards.

Temminck's courser, Cursorius temminckii
Three-banded courser, Rhinoptilus cinctus
Bronze-winged courser, Rhinoptilus chalcopterus
Collared pratincole, Glareola pratincola
Black-winged pratincole, Glareola nordmanni
Madagascar pratincole, Glareola ocularis (A)
Rock pratincole, Glareola nuchalis
Gray pratincole, Glareola cinerea (A)

Gulls, terns, and skimmers

Order: CharadriiformesFamily: Laridae

Laridae is a family of medium to large seabirds, the gulls, terns, and skimmers. Gulls are typically grey or white, often with black markings on the head or wings. They have stout, longish bills and webbed feet. Terns are a group of generally medium to large seabirds typically with grey or white plumage, often with black markings on the head. Most terns hunt fish by diving but some pick insects off the surface of fresh water. Terns are generally long-lived birds, with several species known to live in excess of 30 years. Skimmers are a small family of tropical tern-like birds. They have an elongated lower mandible which they use to feed by flying low over the water surface and skimming the water for small fish.

Slender-billed gull, Larus genei
Gray-hooded gull, Chroicocephalus cirrocephalus
Black-headed gull, Chroicocephalus ridibundus
Pallas's gull, Ichthyaetus ichthyaetus (A)
Caspian gull, Larus cachinnans (A)
Lesser black-backed gull, Larus fuscus
Gull-billed tern, Gelochelidon nilotica
Caspian tern, Hydroprogne caspia (A)
Black tern, Chlidonias niger
White-winged tern, Chlidonias leucopterus
Whiskered tern, Chlidonias hybrida
Common tern, Sterna hirundo (A)
Lesser crested tern, Thalasseus bengalensis (A)
African skimmer, Rynchops flavirostris

Shearwaters and petrels
Order: ProcellariiformesFamily: Procellariidae

The procellariids are the main group of medium-sized "true petrels", characterised by united nostrils with medium septum and a long outer functional primary.

Southern giant-petrel, Macronectes giganteus (A)

Storks

Order: CiconiiformesFamily: Ciconiidae

Storks are large, long-legged, long-necked, wading birds with long, stout bills. Storks are mute, but bill-clattering is an important mode of communication at the nest. Their nests can be large and may be reused for many years. Many species are migratory.

African openbill, Anastomus lamelligerus
Black stork, Ciconia nigra
Abdim's stork, Ciconia abdimii
African woolly-necked stork, Ciconia microscelis
White stork, Ciconia ciconia
Saddle-billed stork, Ephippiorhynchus senegalensis
Marabou stork, Leptoptilos crumenifer
Yellow-billed stork, Mycteria ibis

Anhingas
Order: SuliformesFamily: Anhingidae

Anhingas or darters are often called "snake-birds" because of their long thin neck, which gives a snake-like appearance when they swim with their bodies submerged. The males have black and dark-brown plumage, an erectile crest on the nape and a larger bill than the female. The females have much paler plumage especially on the neck and underparts. The darters have completely webbed feet and their legs are short and set far back on the body. Their plumage is somewhat permeable, like that of cormorants, and they spread their wings to dry after diving.

African darter, Anhinga rufa

Cormorants and shags

Order: SuliformesFamily: Phalacrocoracidae

Phalacrocoracidae is a family of medium to large coastal, fish-eating seabirds that includes cormorants and shags. Plumage colouration varies, with the majority having mainly dark plumage, some species being black-and-white, and a few being colourful.

Long-tailed cormorant, Microcarbo africanus
Great cormorant, Phalacrocorax carbo

Pelicans
Order: PelecaniformesFamily: Pelecanidae

Pelicans are large water birds with a distinctive pouch under their beak. They have webbed feet with four toes.

Great white pelican, Pelecanus onocrotalus
Pink-backed pelican, Pelecanus rufescens

Shoebill

Order: PelecaniformesFamily: Balaenicipididae

The shoebill is a large bird related to the storks. It derives its name from its massive shoe-shaped bill.

Shoebill, Balaeniceps rex

Hamerkop

Order: PelecaniformesFamily: Scopidae

The hamerkop is a medium-sized bird with a long shaggy crest. The shape of its head with a curved bill and crest at the back is reminiscent of a hammer, hence its name. Its plumage is drab-brown all over.

Hamerkop, Scopus umbretta

Herons, egrets, and bitterns

Order: PelecaniformesFamily: Ardeidae

The family Ardeidae contains the bitterns, herons, and egrets. Herons and egrets are medium to large wading birds with long necks and legs. Bitterns tend to be shorter necked and more wary. Members of Ardeidae fly with their necks retracted, unlike other long-necked birds such as storks, ibises, and spoonbills.

Great bittern, Botaurus stellaris (A)
Little bittern, Ixobrychus minutus
Dwarf bittern, Ixobrychus sturmii
White-crested bittern, Tigriornis leucolopha (A)
Gray heron, Ardea cinerea
Black-headed heron, Ardea melanocephala
Goliath heron, Ardea goliath
Purple heron, Ardea purpurea
Great egret, Ardea alba
Intermediate egret, Aedea intermedia
Little egret, Egretta garzetta
Western reef-heron, Egretta gularis (A)
Black heron, Egretta ardesiaca
Cattle egret, Bubulcus ibis
Squacco heron, Ardeola ralloides
Malagasy pond-heron, Ardeola idae (A)
Rufous-bellied heron, Ardeola rufiventris
Striated heron, Butorides striata
Black-crowned night-heron, Nycticorax nycticorax
White-backed night-heron, Gorsachius leuconotus

Ibises and spoonbills

Order: PelecaniformesFamily: Threskiornithidae

Threskiornithidae is a family of large terrestrial and wading birds which includes the ibises and spoonbills. They have long, broad wings with 11 primary and about 20 secondary feathers. They are strong fliers and despite their size and weight, very capable soarers.

Glossy ibis, Plegadis falcinellus
African sacred ibis, Threskiornis aethiopicus
Olive ibis, Bostrychia olivacea
Spot-breasted ibis, Bostrychia rara
Hadada ibis, Bostrychia hagedash
Eurasian spoonbill, Platalea leucorodia 
African spoonbill, Platalea alba

Secretarybird
Order: AccipitriformesFamily: Sagittariidae

The secretarybird is a bird of prey, but is easily distinguished from other raptors by its long crane-like legs.

Secretarybird, Sagittarius serpentarius

Osprey

Order: AccipitriformesFamily: Pandionidae

The family Pandionidae contains only one species, the osprey. The osprey is a medium-large raptor which is a specialist fish-eater with a worldwide distribution.

Osprey, Pandion haliaetus

Hawks, eagles, and kites 
Order: AccipitriformesFamily: Accipitridae

Accipitridae is a family of birds of prey which includes hawks, eagles, kites, harriers, and Old World vultures. These birds have powerful hooked beaks for tearing flesh from their prey, strong legs, powerful talons, and keen eyesight.

Black-winged kite, Elanus caeruleus
Scissor-tailed kite, Chelictinia riocourii
African harrier-hawk, Polyboroides typus
Palm-nut vulture, Gypohierax angolensis
Bearded vulture, Gypaetus barbatus
Egyptian vulture, Neophron percnopterus
European honey-buzzard, Pernis apivorus
African cuckoo-hawk, Aviceda cuculoides
White-headed vulture, Trigonoceps occipitalis
Lappet-faced vulture, Torgos tracheliotos
Hooded vulture, Necrosyrtes monachus
White-backed vulture, Gyps africanus
Rüppell's griffon, Gyps rueppelli
Bateleur, Terathopius ecaudatus
Congo serpent-eagle, Dryotriorchis spectabilis
Short-toed snake-eagle, Circaetus gallicus (A)
Beaudouin's snake-eagle, Circaetus beaudouini
Black-chested snake-eagle, Circaetus pectoralis
Brown snake-eagle, Circaetus cinereus
Banded snake-eagle, Circaetus cinerascens
Bat hawk, Macheiramphus alcinus
Crowned eagle, Stephanoaetus coronatus
Martial eagle, Polemaetus bellicosus
Long-crested eagle, Lophaetus occipitalis
Lesser spotted eagle, Clanga pomarina
Greater spotted eagle, Clanga clanga
Wahlberg's eagle, Hieraaetus wahlbergi
Booted eagle, Hieraaetus pennatus
Ayres's hawk-eagle, Hieraaetus ayresii
Tawny eagle, Aquila rapax
Steppe eagle, Aquila nipalensis
Cassin's hawk-eagle, Aquila africana
Verreaux's eagle, Aquila verreauxii
African hawk-eagle, Aquila spilogaster
Lizard buzzard, Kaupifalco monogrammicus
Dark chanting-goshawk, Melierax metabates
Eastern chanting-goshawk, Melierax poliopterus
Gabar goshawk, Micronisus gabar
Grasshopper buzzard, Butastur rufipennis
Eurasian marsh-harrier, Circus aeruginosus
African marsh-harrier, Circus ranivorus
Pallid harrier, Circus macrourus
Montagu's harrier, Circus pygargus
African goshawk, Accipiter tachiro
Chestnut-flanked sparrowhawk, Accipiter castanilius
Shikra, Accipiter badius
Levant sparrowhawk, Accipiter brevipes (A)
Red-thighed sparrowhawk, Accipiter erythropus
Little sparrowhawk, Accipiter minullus
Ovambo sparrowhawk, Accipiter ovampensis
Rufous-breasted sparrowhawk, Accipiter rufiventris
Black goshawk, Accipiter melanoleucus
Long-tailed hawk, Urotriorchis macrourus
Black kite, Milvus migrans
African fish-eagle, Haliaeetus vocifer
Common buzzard, Buteo buteo
Mountain buzzard, Buteo oreophilus
Long-legged buzzard, Buteo rufinus
Red-necked buzzard, Buteo auguralis
Augur buzzard, Buteo augur

Barn-owls
Order: StrigiformesFamily: Tytonidae

Barn-owls are medium to large owls with large heads and characteristic heart-shaped faces. They have long strong legs with powerful talons.

African grass-owl, Tyto capensis
Barn owl, Tyto alba

Owls

Order: StrigiformesFamily: Strigidae

The typical owls are small to large solitary nocturnal birds of prey. They have large forward-facing eyes and ears, a hawk-like beak, and a conspicuous circle of feathers around each eye called a facial disk.

Eurasian scops-owl, Otus scops
African scops-owl, Otus senegalensis
Northern white-faced owl, Ptilopsis leucotis
Southern white-faced owl, Ptilopsis granti
Cape eagle-owl, Bubo capensis
Spotted eagle-owl, Bubo africanus
Grayish eagle-owl, Bubo cinerascens
Fraser's eagle-owl, Bubo poensis
Shelley's eagle-owl, Bubo shelleyi
Verreaux's eagle-owl, Bubo lacteus
Pel's fishing owl, Scotopelia peli
Pearl-spotted owlet, Glaucidium perlatum
Red-chested owlet, Glaucidium tephronotum
African barred owlet, Glaucidium capense
African wood-owl, Strix woodfordii
Short-eared owl, Asio flammeus
Marsh owl, Asio capensis

Mousebirds

Order: ColiiformesFamily: Coliidae

The mousebirds are slender greyish or brown birds with soft, hairlike body feathers and very long thin tails. They are arboreal and scurry through the leaves like rodents in search of berries, fruit, and buds. They are acrobatic and can feed upside down. All species have strong claws and reversible outer toes. They also have crests and stubby bills.

Speckled mousebird, Colius striatus
Blue-naped mousebird, Urocolius macrourus

Trogons

Order: TrogoniformesFamily: Trogonidae

The family Trogonidae includes trogons and quetzals. Found in tropical woodlands worldwide, they feed on insects and fruit, and their broad bills and weak legs reflect their diet and arboreal habits. Although their flight is fast, they are reluctant to fly any distance. Trogons have soft, often colourful, feathers with distinctive male and female plumage.

Narina trogon, Apaloderma narina
Bar-tailed trogon, Apaloderma vittatum

Hoopoes
Order: CoraciiformesFamily: Upupidae

Hoopoes have black, white, and orangey-pink colouring with a large erectile crest on their head.

Eurasian hoopoe, Upupa epops

Woodhoopoes and scimitarbills

Order: CoraciiformesFamily: Phoeniculidae

The woodhoopoes are related to the hoopoes, ground-hornbills, and hornbills. They most resemble the hoopoes with their long curved bills, used to probe for insects, and short rounded wings. However, they differ in that they have metallic plumage, often blue, green, or purple, and lack an erectile crest.

Green woodhoopoe, Phoeniculus purpureus
White-headed woodhoopoe, Phoeniculus bollei
Forest woodhoopoe, Phoeniculus castaneiceps
Black scimitarbill, Rhinopomastus aterrimus
Common scimitarbill, Rhinopomastus cyanomelas
Abyssinian scimitarbill, Rhinopomastus minor

Ground-hornbills
Order: BucerotiformesFamily: Bucorvidae

The ground-hornbills are terrestrial birds which feed almost entirely on insects, other birds, snakes, and amphibians.

Abyssinian ground-hornbill, Bucorvus abyssinicus
Southern ground-hornbill, Bucorvus leadbeateri

Hornbills

Order: CoraciiformesFamily: Bucerotidae

Hornbills are a group of birds whose bill is shaped like a cow's horn, but without a twist, sometimes with a casque on the upper mandible. Frequently, the bill is brightly coloured.

Red-billed dwarf hornbill, Lophoceros camurus
Crowned hornbill, Lophoceros alboterminatus
African pied hornbill, Lophoceros fasciatus
Hemprich's hornbill, Lophoceros hemprichii
African gray hornbill, Lophoceros nasutus
Eastern yellow-billed hornbill, Tockus flavirostris
Jackson's hornbill, Tockus jacksoni
Von der Decken's hornbill, Tockus deckeni
Northern red-billed hornbill, Tockus erythrorhynchus
White-crested hornbill, Horizocerus albocristatus
Black dwarf hornbill, Horizocerus hartlaubi
Black-casqued hornbill, Ceratogymna atrata
Black-and-white-casqued hornbill, Bycanistes subcylindricus
Brown-cheeked hornbill, Bycanistes cylindricus
White-thighed hornbill, Bycanistes albotibialis
Piping hornbill, Bycanistes fistulator

Kingfishers

Order: CoraciiformesFamily: Alcedinidae

Kingfishers are medium-sized birds with large heads, long, pointed bills, short legs, and stubby tails.

Half-collared kingfisher, Alcedo semitorquata
Shining-blue kingfisher, Alcedo quadribrachys
Malachite kingfisher, Corythornis cristatus
White-bellied kingfisher, Corythornis leucogaster
African pygmy kingfisher, Ispidina picta
African dwarf kingfisher, Ispidina lecontei
Chocolate-backed kingfisher, Halcyon badia
Gray-headed kingfisher, Halcyon leucocephala
Woodland kingfisher, Halcyon senegalensis
Blue-breasted kingfisher, Halcyon malimbica
Striped kingfisher, Halcyon chelicuti
Giant kingfisher, Megaceryle maximus
Pied kingfisher, Ceryle rudis

Bee-eaters

Order: CoraciiformesFamily: Meropidae

The bee-eaters are a group of near passerine birds. Most species are found in Africa but others occur in southern Europe, Madagascar, Australia, and New Guinea. They are characterised by richly coloured plumage, slender bodies, and usually elongated central tail feathers. All are colourful and have long downturned bills and pointed wings, which give them a swallow-like appearance when seen from afar.

Black bee-eater, Merops gularis
Red-throated bee-eater, Merops bulocki
White-fronted bee-eater, Merops bullockoides
Little bee-eater, Merops pusillus
Blue-breasted bee-eater, Merops variegatus
Cinnamon-chested bee-eater, Merops oreobates
Swallow-tailed bee-eater, Merops hirundineus
White-throated bee-eater, Merops albicollis
African green bee-eater, Merops viridissimus
Blue-cheeked bee-eater, Merops persicus
Madagascar bee-eater, Merops superciliosus
European bee-eater, Merops apiaster
Northern carmine bee-eater, Merops nubicus
Southern carmine bee-eater, Merops nubicoides (A)

Rollers

Order: CoraciiformesFamily: Coraciidae

Rollers resemble crows in size and build, but are more closely related to the kingfishers and bee-eaters. They share the colourful appearance of those groups with blues and browns predominating. The two inner front toes are connected, but the outer toe is not.

European roller, Coracias garrulus
Abyssinian roller, Coracias abyssinica
Lilac-breasted roller, Coracias caudata
Rufous-crowned roller, Coracias naevia
Broad-billed roller, Eurystomus glaucurus
Blue-throated roller, Eurystomus gularis

African barbets

Order: PiciformesFamily: Lybiidae

The barbets are plump birds, with short necks and large heads. They get their name from the bristles which fringe their heavy bills. Most species are brightly coloured.

Yellow-billed barbet, Trachyphonus purpuratus
Crested barbet, Trachyphonus vaillantii
Red-and-yellow barbet, Trachyphonus erythrocephalus
D'Arnaud's barbet, Trachyphonus darnaudii
Gray-throated barbet, Gymnobucco bonapartei
Speckled tinkerbird, Pogoniulus scolopaceus
Green tinkerbird, Pogoniulus simplex
Moustached tinkerbird, Pogoniulus leucomystax
Western tinkerbird, Pogoniulus coryphaea
Red-rumped tinkerbird, Pogoniulus atroflavus
Yellow-throated tinkerbird, Pogoniulus subsulphureus
Yellow-rumped tinkerbird, Pogoniulus bilineatus
Red-fronted tinkerbird, Pogoniulus pusillus
Yellow-fronted tinkerbird, Pogoniulus chrysoconus
Yellow-spotted barbet, Buccanodon duchaillui
Hairy-breasted barbet, Tricholaema hirsuta
Red-fronted barbet, Tricholaema diademata
Spot-flanked barbet, Tricholaema lachrymosa
Black-throated barbet, Tricholaema melanocephala
White-headed barbet, Lybius leucocephalus
Red-faced barbet, Lybius rubrifacies
Black-billed barbet, Lybius guifsobalito
Black-collared barbet, Lybius torquatus
Double-toothed barbet, Lybius bidentatus
Black-breasted barbet, Lybius rolleti

Honeyguides
Order: PiciformesFamily: Indicatoridae

Honeyguides are among the few birds that feed on wax. They are named for the greater honeyguide which leads traditional honey-hunters to bees' nests and, after the hunters have harvested the honey, feeds on the remaining contents of the hive.

Cassin's honeyguide, Prodotiscus insignis
Wahlberg's honeyguide, Prodotiscus regulus
Zenker's honeyguide, Melignomon zenkeri
Dwarf honeyguide, Indicator pumilio
Willcock's honeyguide, Indicator willcocksi
Pallid honeyguide, Indicator meliphilus
Least honeyguide, Indicator exilis
Lesser honeyguide, Indicator minor
Spotted honeyguide, Indicator maculatus
Scaly-throated honeyguide, Indicator variegatus
Greater honeyguide, Indicator indicator
Lyre-tailed honeyguide, Melichneutes robustus

Woodpeckers

Order: PiciformesFamily: Picidae

Woodpeckers are small to medium-sized birds with chisel-like beaks, short legs, stiff tails, and long tongues used for capturing insects. Some species have feet with two toes pointing forward and two backward, while several species have only three toes. Many woodpeckers have the habit of tapping noisily on tree trunks with their beaks.

Eurasian wryneck, Jynx torquilla
Rufous-necked wryneck, Jynx ruficollis
African piculet, Verreauxia africana
Gabon woodpecker, Chloropicus gabonensis
Elliot's woodpecker, Chloropicus elliotii
Speckle-breasted woodpecker, Chloropicus poecilolaemus
Cardinal woodpecker, Chloropicus fuscescens
Bearded woodpecker, Chloropicus namaquus
Golden-crowned woodpecker, Chloropicus xantholophus
Brown-backed woodpecker, Chloropicus obsoletus
African gray woodpecker, Chloropicus goertae
Olive woodpecker, Chloropicus griseocephalus
Brown-eared woodpecker, Campethera caroli
Buff-spotted woodpecker, Campethera nivosa
Tullberg's woodpecker, Campethera tullbergi
Green-backed woodpecker, Campethera cailliautii
Nubian woodpecker, Campethera nubica
Golden-tailed woodpecker, Campethera abingoni

Falcons and caracaras

Order: FalconiformesFamily: Falconidae

Falconidae is a family of diurnal birds of prey. They differ from hawks, eagles, and kites in that they kill with their beaks instead of their talons.

Pygmy falcon, Polihierax semitorquatus
Lesser kestrel, Falco naumanni
Eurasian kestrel, Falco tinnunculus
Greater kestrel, Falco rupicoloides (A)
Fox kestrel, Falco alopex
Gray kestrel, Falco ardosiaceus
Dickinson's kestrel, Falco dickinsoni (A)
Red-necked falcon, Falco chicquera
Red-footed falcon, Falco vespertinus (A)
Amur falcon, Falco amurensis
Eleonora's falcon, Falco eleonorae
Sooty falcon, Falco concolor (A)
Eurasian hobby, Falco subbuteo
African hobby, Falco cuvierii
Lanner falcon, Falco biarmicus
Saker falcon, Falco cherrug (A)
Peregrine falcon, Falco peregrinus
Taita falcon, Falco fasciinucha

Old World parrots
Order: PsittaciformesFamily: Psittaculidae

Characteristic features of parrots include a strong curved bill, an upright stance, strong legs, and clawed zygodactyl feet. Many parrots are vividly coloured, and some are multi-coloured. Old World parrots are found from Africa east across south and southeast Asia and Oceania to Australia and New Zealand.

Rose-ringed parakeet, Psittacula krameri
Black-collared lovebird, Agapornis swinderniana
Red-headed lovebird, Agapornis pullarius

African and New World parrots

Order: PsittaciformesFamily: Psittacidae

Characteristic features of parrots include a strong curved bill, an upright stance, strong legs, and clawed zygodactyl feet. Many parrots are vividly coloured, and some are multi-coloured. Most of the more than 150 species in this family are found in the New World.

Gray parrot, Psittacus erithacus
Brown-necked parrot, Poicephalus fuscicollis (A)
Meyer's parrot, Poicephalus meyeri

African and green broadbills
Order: PasseriformesFamily: Calyptomenidae

The broadbills are small, brightly coloured birds which feed on fruit and also take insects in flycatcher fashion, snapping their broad bills. Their habitat is canopies of wet forests.

African broadbill, Smithornis capensis
Rufous-sided broadbill, Smithornis rufolateralis

Asian and Grauer's broadbills
Order: PasseriformesFamily: Eurylaimidae

Only one member of this small family is found in Africa, and its range is limited to Uganda and the Democratic Republic of Congo. It feeds mostly on fruits.

Grauer's broadbill, Pseudocalyptomena graueri

Pittas
Order: PasseriformesFamily: Pittidae

Pittas are medium-sized by passerine standards and are stocky, with fairly long, strong legs, short tails, and stout bills. Many are brightly coloured. They spend the majority of their time on wet forest floors, eating snails, insects, and similar invertebrates.

African pitta, Pitta angolensis
Green-breasted pitta, Pitta reichenowi

Cuckooshrikes

Order: PasseriformesFamily: Campephagidae

The cuckooshrikes are small to medium-sized passerine birds. They are predominantly greyish with white and black, although some species are brightly coloured.

Gray cuckooshrike, Coracina caesia
White-breasted cuckooshrike, Coracina pectoralis
Black cuckooshrike, Campephaga flava
Petit's cuckooshrike, Campephaga petiti
Red-shouldered cuckooshrike, Campephaga phoenicea
Purple-throated cuckooshrike, Campephaga quiscalina

Old World orioles
Order: PasseriformesFamily: Oriolidae

The Old World orioles are colourful passerine birds. They are not related to the New World orioles.

Eurasian golden oriole, Oriolus oriolus
African golden oriole, Oriolus auratus
Western black-headed oriole, Oriolus brachyrhynchus
African black-headed oriole, Oriolus larvatus
Black-tailed oriole, Oriolus percivali
Black-winged oriole, Oriolus nigripennis

Wattle-eyes and batises

Order: PasseriformesFamily: Platysteiridae

The wattle-eyes, or puffback flycatchers, are small stout passerine birds of the African tropics. They get their name from the brightly coloured fleshy eye decorations found in most species in this group.

Brown-throated wattle-eye, Platysteira cyanea
Black-throated wattle-eye, Platysteira peltata
Chestnut wattle-eye, Platysteira castanea
Jameson's wattle-eye, Platysteira jamesoni
Yellow-bellied wattle-eye, Platysteira concreta
Rwenzori batis, Batis diops
Chinspot batis, Batis molitor
Gray-headed batis, Batis orientalis
Western black-headed batis, Batis erlangeri
Pygmy batis, Batis perkeo
Ituri batis, Batis ituriensis

Vangas, helmetshrikes, and allies

Order: PasseriformesFamily: Vangidae

The helmetshrikes are similar in build to the shrikes, but tend to be colourful species with distinctive crests or other head ornaments, from which they get their name.

White helmetshrike, Prionops plumatus
Yellow-crested helmetshrike, Prionops alberti 
Red-billed helmetshrike, Prionops caniceps
Rufous-bellied helmetshrike, Prionops rufiventris
African shrike-flycatcher, Megabyas flammulatus
Black-and-white shrike-flycatcher, Bias musicus

Bushshrikes and allies

Order: PasseriformesFamily: Malaconotidae

Bushshrikes are similar in habits to shrikes, hunting insects and other small prey from a perch on a bush. Although similar in build to the shrikes, these tend to be either colourful species or largely black; some species are quite secretive.

Brubru, Nilaus afer
Northern puffback, Dryoscopus gambensis
Black-backed puffback, Dryoscopus cubla
Red-eyed puffback, Dryoscopus senegalensis
Pink-footed puffback, Dryoscopus angolensis
Marsh tchagra, Tchagra minutus
Black-crowned tchagra, Tchagra senegalus
Brown-crowned tchagra, Tchagra australis
Three-streaked tchagra, Tchagra jamesi
Lühder's bushshrike, Laniarius luehderi
Tropical boubou, Laniarius major
Black-headed gonolek, Laniarius erythrogaster
Papyrus gonolek, Laniarius mufumbiri
Slate-coloured boubou, Laniarius funebris
Lowland sooty boubou, Laniarius leucorhynchus
Willard's sooty boubou, Laniarius willardi
Albertine boubou, Laniarius holomelas
Fülleborn's boubou, Laniarius fuelleborni
Gray-green bushshrike, Telophorus bocagei
Sulphur-breasted bushshrike, Telophorus sulfureopectus
Many-colored bushshrike, Telophorus multicolor
Doherty's bushshrike, Telophorus dohertyi
Fiery-breasted bushshrike, Malaconotus cruentus
Lagden's bushshrike, Malaconotus lagdeni
Gray-headed bushshrike, Malaconotus blanchoti

Drongos
Order: PasseriformesFamily: Dicruridae

The drongos are mostly black or dark grey in colour, sometimes with metallic tints. They have long forked tails, and some Asian species have elaborate tail decorations. They have short legs and sit very upright when perched, like a shrike. They flycatch or take prey from the ground.

Sharpe's drongo, Dicrurus sharpei
Fork-tailed drongo, Dicrurus adsimilis
Glossy-backed drongo, Dicrurus divaricatus
Velvet-mantled drongo, Dicrurus modestus

Monarch flycatchers
Order: PasseriformesFamily: Monarchidae

The monarch flycatchers are small to medium-sized insectivorous passerines which hunt by flycatching.

Blue-headed crested-flycatcher, Trochocercus nitens
African crested-flycatcher, Trochocercus cyanomelas
Black-headed paradise-flycatcher, Terpsiphone rufiventer
African paradise-flycatcher, Terpsiphone viridis

Shrikes

Order: PasseriformesFamily: Laniidae

Shrikes are passerine birds known for their habit of catching other birds and small animals and impaling the uneaten portions of their bodies on thorns. A shrike's beak is hooked, like that of a typical bird of prey.

Red-backed shrike, Lanius collurio
Red-tailed shrike, Lanius phoenicuroides
Isabelline shrike, Lanius isabellinus
Emin's shrike, Lanius gubernator
Lesser gray shrike, Lanius minor
Gray-backed fiscal, Lanius excubitoroides
Yellow-billed shrike, Lanius corvinus
Taita fiscal, Lanius dorsalis
Mackinnon's shrike, Lanius mackinnoni
Northern fiscal, Lanius humeralis
Souza's shrike, Lanius souzae 
Masked shrike, Lanius nubicus (A)
Woodchat shrike, Lanius senator
White-rumped shrike, Eurocephalus ruppelli

Crows, jays, and magpies

Order: PasseriformesFamily: Corvidae

The family Corvidae includes crows, ravens, jays, choughs, magpies, treepies, nutcrackers, and ground jays. Corvids are above average in size among the Passeriformes, and some of the larger species show high levels of intelligence.

Piapiac, Ptilostomus afer
Pied crow, Corvus albus
Somali crow, Corvus edithae
Fan-tailed raven, Corvus rhipidurus
White-necked raven, Corvus albicollis

Hyliotas
Order: PasseriformesFamily: Hyliotidae

The members of this small family, all of genus Hyliota, are birds of the forest canopy. They tend to feed in mixed-species flocks.

Yellow-bellied hyliota, Hyliota flavigaster
Southern hyliota, Hyliota australis

Fairy flycatchers

Order: PasseriformesFamily: Stenostiridae

Most of the species of this small family are found in Africa, though a few inhabit tropical Asia. They are not closely related to other birds called "flycatchers".

African blue flycatcher, Elminia longicauda
White-tailed blue flycatcher, Elminia albicauda
Dusky crested-flycatcher, Elminia nigromitrata
White-bellied crested-flycatcher, Elminia albiventris
White-tailed crested-flycatcher, Elminia albonotata

Tits, chickadees, and titmice
Order: PasseriformesFamily: Paridae

The Paridae are mainly small stocky woodland species with short stout bills. Some have crests. They are adaptable birds, with a mixed diet including seeds and insects.

White-shouldered black-tit, Melaniparus guineensis
White-winged black-tit, Parus leucomelas
White-bellied tit, Melaniparus albiventris
Dusky tit, Melaniparus funereus
Stripe-breasted tit, Melaniparus fasciiventer
Somali tit, Melaniparus thruppi

Penduline-tits
Order: PasseriformesFamily: Remizidae

The penduline-tits are a group of small passerine birds related to the true tits. They are insectivores.

Mouse-colored penduline-tit, Anthoscopus musculus
Yellow penduline-tit, Anthoscopus parvulus
African penduline-tit, Anthoscopus caroli

Larks

Order: PasseriformesFamily: Alaudidae

Larks are small terrestrial birds with often extravagant songs and display flights. Most larks are fairly dull in appearance. Their food is insects and seeds.

Rufous-rumped lark, Pinarocorys erythropygia
Dusky lark, Pinarocorys nigricans (A)
Chestnut-backed sparrow-lark, Eremopterix leucotis
Fischer's sparrow-lark, Eremopterix leucopareia
Pink-breasted lark, Calendulauda poecilosterna
Fawn-colored lark, Calendulauda africanoides
Red-winged lark, Mirafra hypermetra
Rufous-naped lark, Mirafra africana
Flappet lark, Mirafra rufocinnamomea
White-tailed lark, Mirafra albicauda
Horsfield’s bushlark, Mirafra javanica
Red-capped lark, Calandrella cinerea
Sun lark, Galerida modesta

Nicators

Order: PasseriformesFamily: Nicatoridae

The nicators are shrike-like, with hooked bills. They are endemic to sub-Saharan Africa.

Western nicator, Nicator chloris
Yellow-throated nicator, Nicator vireo

African warblers
Order: PasseriformesFamily: Macrosphenidae

African warblers are small to medium-sized insectivores which are found in a wide variety of habitats south of the Sahara.

Green crombec, Sylvietta virens
Lemon-bellied crombec, Sylvietta denti
White-browed crombec, Sylvietta leucophrys
Northern crombec, Sylvietta brachyura
Red-faced crombec, Sylvietta whytii
Moustached grass-warbler, Melocichla mentalis
Yellow longbill, Macrosphenus flavicans
Gray longbill, Macrosphenus concolor
Grauer's warbler, Graueria vittata
Green hylia, Hylia prasina
Tit-hylia, Pholidornis rushiae

Cisticolas and allies
Order: PasseriformesFamily: Cisticolidae

The Cisticolidae are warblers found mainly in warmer southern regions of the Old World. They are generally very small birds of drab brown or grey appearance found in open country such as grassland or scrub.

Yellow-vented eremomela, Eremomela flavicrissalis
Yellow-bellied eremomela, Eremomela icteropygialis
Green-backed eremomela, Eremomela canescens
Greencap eremomela, Eremomela scotops
Rufous-crowned eremomela, Eremomela badiceps
Turner's eremomela, Eremomela turneri
Red-winged gray warbler, Drymocichla incana
White-chinned prinia, Schistolais leucopogon
Black-collared apalis, Oreolais pulcher
Rwenzori apalis, Oreolais ruwenzori
Miombo wren-warbler, Calamonastes undosus (A) 
Gray wren-warbler, Calamonastes simplex
Green-backed camaroptera, Camaroptera brachyura
Yellow-browed camaroptera, Camaroptera superciliaris
Olive-green camaroptera, Camaroptera chloronota
Cricket longtail, Spiloptila clamans
Buff-bellied warbler, Phyllolais pulchella
Black-capped apalis, Apalis nigriceps
Black-throated apalis, Apalis jacksoni
Masked apalis, Apalis binotata
Black-faced apalis, Apalis personata
Yellow-breasted apalis, Apalis flavida
Buff-throated apalis, Apalis rufogularis
Chestnut-throated apalis, Apalis porphyrolaema
Gray apalis, Apalis cinerea
Karamoja apalis, Apalis karamojae
Tawny-flanked prinia, Prinia subflava
Pale prinia, Prinia somalica
Banded prinia, Prinia bairdii
Red-winged prinia, Prinia erythroptera
Red-fronted prinia, Prinia rufifrons
Black-faced rufous-warbler, Bathmocercus rufus
Gray-capped warbler, Eminia lepida
Red-faced cisticola, Cisticola erythrops
Singing cisticola, Cisticola cantans
Whistling cisticola, Cisticola lateralis
Trilling cisticola, Cisticola woosnami
Chubb's cisticola, Cisticola chubbi
Hunter's cisticola, Cisticola hunteri
Rock-loving cisticola, Cisticola aberrans
Boran cisticola, Cisticola bodessa (A)
Rattling cisticola, Cisticola chiniana
Red-pate cisticola, Cisticola ruficeps
Wailing cisticola, Cisticola lais
Winding cisticola, Cisticola galactotes
Carruthers's cisticola, Cisticola carruthersi
Stout cisticola, Cisticola robustus
Croaking cisticola, Cisticola natalensis
Tabora cisticola, Cisticola angusticauda
Siffling cisticola, Cisticola brachypterus
Foxy cisticola, Cisticola troglodytes
Tiny cisticola, Cisticola nana (A)
Zitting cisticola, Cisticola juncidis
Desert cisticola, Cisticola aridulus (A)
Black-backed cisticola, Cisticola eximius
Wing-snapping cisticola, Cisticola ayresii

Reed warblers and allies
Order: PasseriformesFamily: Acrocephalidae

The members of this family are usually rather large for "warblers". Most are rather plain olivaceous brown above with much yellow to beige below. They are usually found in open woodland, reedbeds, or tall grass. The family occurs mostly in southern to western Eurasia and surroundings, but it also ranges far into the Pacific, with some species in  Africa.

Papyrus yellow-warbler, Calamonastides gracilirostris
Eastern olivaceous warbler, Iduna pallida
African yellow-warbler, Iduna natalensis
Mountain yellow-warbler, Iduna similis
Upcher's warbler, Hippolais languida
Icterine warbler, Hippolais icterina
Sedge warbler, Acrocephalus schoenobaenus
Marsh warbler, Acrocephalus palustris
Common reed warbler, Acrocephalus scirpaceus
Basra reed warbler, Acrocephalus griseldis (A)
Lesser swamp warbler, Acrocephalus gracilirostris
Greater swamp warbler, Acrocephalus rufescens
Great reed warbler, Acrocephalus arundinaceus

Grassbirds and allies
Order: PasseriformesFamily: Locustellidae

Locustellidae are a family of small insectivorous songbirds found mainly in Eurasia, Africa, and the Australian region. They are smallish birds with tails that are usually long and pointed, and tend to be drab brownish or buffy all over.

Bamboo warbler, Locustella alfredi
River warbler, Locustella fluviatilis (A)
Fan-tailed grassbird, Catriscus brevirostris
Evergreen-forest warbler, Bradypterus lopezi
Cinnamon bracken-warbler, Bradypterus cinnamomeus
White-winged swamp warbler, Bradypterus carpalis
Grauer's swamp warbler, Bradypterus graueri
Highland rush warbler, Bradypterus centralis

Swallows

Order: PasseriformesFamily: Hirundinidae

The family Hirundinidae is adapted to aerial feeding. They have a slender streamlined body, long pointed wings, and a short bill with a wide gape. The feet are adapted to perching rather than walking, and the front toes are partially joined at the base.

Plain martin, Riparia paludicola
Bank swallow, Riparia riparia
Banded martin, Neophedina cincta
Rock martin, Ptyonoprogne fuligula
Barn swallow, Hirundo rustica
Ethiopian swallow, Hirundo aethiopica
Angola swallow, Hirundo angolensis
White-throated blue swallow, Hirundo nigrita
Wire-tailed swallow, Hirundo smithii
Montane blue swallow, Hirundo atrocaerulea
Red-rumped swallow, Cecropis daurica
Lesser striped swallow, Cecropis abyssinica
Rufous-chested swallow, Cecropis semirufa
Mosque swallow, Cecropis senegalensis
Common house-martin, Delichon urbicum
White-headed sawwing, Psalidoprocne albiceps
Black sawwing, Psalidoprocne pristoptera
Gray-rumped swallow, Pseudhirundo griseopyga

Bulbuls

Order: PasseriformesFamily: Pycnonotidae

Bulbuls are medium-sized songbirds. Some are colourful with yellow, red, or orange vents, cheeks, throats or supercilia, but most are drab, with uniform olive-brown to black plumage. Some species have distinct crests.

Slender-billed greenbul, Stelgidillas gracilirostris
Red-tailed bristlebill, Bleda syndactylus
Lesser bristlebill, Bleda notatus
Shelley's greenbul, Arizelocichla masukuensis
Eastern mountain greenbul, Arizelocichla nigriceps
Simple greenbul, Chlorocichla simplex
Joyful greenbul, Chlorocichla laetissima
Honeyguide greenbul, Baeopogon indicator
Yellow-throated greenbul, Atimastillas flavicollis
Spotted greenbul, Ixonotus guttatus
Swamp greenbul, Thescelocichla leucopleura
Red-tailed greenbul, Criniger calurus
Eastern bearded-greenbul, Criniger chloronotus
Gray greenbul, Eurillas gracilis
Ansorge's greenbul, Eurillas ansorgei (A)
Plain greenbul, Eurillas curvirostris
Yellow-whiskered bulbul, Eurillas latirostris
Little greenbul, Eurillas virens
Leaf-love, Phyllastrephus scandens
Northern brownbul, Phyllastrephus strepitans
Toro olive-greenbul, Phyllastrephus hypochloris
Cabanis's greenbul, Phyllastrephus cabanisi
Icterine greenbul, Phyllastrephus icterinus
Sassi's greenbul, Phyllastrephus lorenzi (A)
Xavier's greenbul, Phyllastrephus xavieri
White-throated greenbul, Phyllastrephus albigularis
Yellow-streaked greenbul, Phyllastrephus flavostriatus
Common bulbul, Pycnonotus barbatus

Leaf warblers
Order: PasseriformesFamily: Phylloscopidae

Leaf warblers are a family of small insectivorous birds found mostly in Eurasia and ranging into Wallacea and Africa. The species are of various sizes, often green-plumaged above and yellow below, or more subdued with greyish-green to greyish-brown colours.

Wood warbler, Phylloscopus sibilatrix
Willow warbler, Phylloscopus trochilus
Common chiffchaff, Phylloscopus collybita
Brown woodland-warbler, Phylloscopus umbrovirens
Red-faced woodland-warbler, Phylloscopus laetus
Uganda woodland-warbler, Phylloscopus budongoensis

Bush warblers and allies
Order: PasseriformesFamily: Scotocercidae

The members of this family are found throughout Africa, Asia, and Polynesia. Their taxonomy is in flux, and some authorities place genus Erythrocerus in another family.

Chestnut-capped flycatcher, Erythrocercus mccallii
Neumann's warbler, Urosphena neumanni

Sylviid warblers, parrotbills, and allies
Order: PasseriformesFamily: Sylviidae

The family Sylviidae is a group of small insectivorous passerine birds. They mainly occur as breeding species, as the common name implies, in Europe, Asia and, to a lesser extent, Africa. Most are of generally undistinguished appearance, but many have distinctive songs.

Eurasian blackcap, Sylvia atricapilla
Garden warbler, Sylvia borin
African hill babbler, Sylvia abyssinica
Rwenzori hill babbler, Sylvia atriceps
Barred warbler, Curruca nisoria
Brown parisoma, Curruca lugens
Greater whitethroat, Curruca communis

White-eyes, yuhinas, and allies
Order: PasseriformesFamily: Zosteropidae

The white-eyes are small and mostly undistinguished, their plumage above being generally some dull colour like greenish-olive, but some species have a white or bright yellow throat, breast, or lower parts, and several have buff flanks. As their name suggests, many species have a white ring around each eye.

Green white-eye, Zosterops stuhlmanni
Northern yellow white-eye, Zosterops senegalensis
Southern yellow white-eye, Zosterops anderssoni

Ground babblers and allies
Order: PasseriformesFamily: Pellorneidae

These small to medium-sized songbirds have soft fluffy plumage but are otherwise rather diverse. Members of the genus Illadopsis are found in forests, but some other genera are birds of scrublands.

Brown illadopsis, Illadopsis fulvescens
Pale-breasted illadopsis, Illadopsis rufipennis
Mountain illadopsis, Illadopsis pyrrhoptera
Scaly-breasted illadopsis, Illadopsis albipectus
Puvel's illadopsis, Illadopsis puveli

Laughingthrushes and allies
Order: PasseriformesFamily: Leiothrichidae

The members of this family are diverse in size and colouration, though those of genus Turdoides tend to be brown or greyish. The family is found in Africa, India, and southeast Asia.

Rufous chatterer, Argya rubiginosa
Capuchin babbler, Turdoides atripennis
Red-collared mountain-babbler, Turdoides rufocinctus
Brown babbler, Turdoides plebejus
Arrow-marked babbler, Turdoides jardineii
Dusky babbler, Turdoides tenebrosa
Black-lored babbler, Turdoides sharpei

Treecreepers
Order: PasseriformesFamily: Certhiidae

Treecreepers are small woodland birds, brown above and white below. They have thin pointed down-curved bills, which they use to extricate insects from bark. They have stiff tail feathers, like woodpeckers, which they use to support themselves on vertical trees.

African spotted creeper, Salpornis salvadori

Oxpeckers
Order: PasseriformesFamily: Buphagidae

As both the English and scientific names of these birds imply, they feed on ectoparasites, primarily ticks, found on large mammals.

Red-billed oxpecker, Buphagus erythrorynchus
Yellow-billed oxpecker, Buphagus africanus

Starlings
Order: PasseriformesFamily: Sturnidae

Starlings are small to medium-sized passerine birds. Their flight is strong and direct and they are very gregarious. Their preferred habitat is fairly open country. They eat insects and fruit. Plumage is typically dark with a metallic sheen.

Wattled starling, Creatophora cinerea
Violet-backed starling, Cinnyricinclus leucogaster
Slender-billed starling, Onychognathus tenuirostris
Neumann's starling, Onychognathus neumanni
Red-winged starling, Onychognathus morio
Chestnut-winged starling, Onychognathus fulgidus
Waller's starling, Onychognathus walleri
Bristle-crowned starling, Onychognathus salvadorii
Magpie starling, Speculipastor bicolor (A) 
Sharpe's starling, Poeoptera sharpii
Narrow-tailed starling, Poeoptera lugubris
Stuhlmann's starling, Poeoptera stuhlmanni
Purple-headed starling, Hylopsar purpureiceps
Rüppell's starling, Lamprotornis purpuropterus
Splendid starling, Lamprotornis splendidus
Superb starling, Lamprotornis superbus
Lesser blue-eared starling, Lamprotornis chloropterus
Greater blue-eared starling, Lamprotornis chalybaeus
Purple starling, Lamprotornis purpureus
Bronze-tailed starling, Lamprotornis chalcurus

Thrushes and allies

Order: PasseriformesFamily: Turdidae

The thrushes are a group of passerine birds that occur mainly in the Old World. They are plump, soft plumaged, small to medium-sized insectivores or sometimes omnivores, often feeding on the ground. Many have attractive songs.

Rufous flycatcher-thrush, Neocossyphus fraseri
Red-tailed ant-thrush, Neocossyphus rufus
White-tailed ant-thrush, Neocossyphus poensis
Black-eared ground-thrush, Geokichla cameronensis
Gray ground-thrush, Geokichla princei
Oberländer's ground-thrush, Geokichla oberlaenderi
Abyssinian ground-thrush, Geokichla piaggiae
Abyssinian thrush, Turdus abyssinicus
African thrush, Turdus pelios

Old World flycatchers
Order: PasseriformesFamily: Muscicapidae

Old World flycatchers are a large group of small passerine birds native to the Old World. They are mainly small arboreal insectivores. The appearance of these birds is highly varied, but they mostly have weak songs and harsh calls.

African dusky flycatcher, Muscicapa adusta
Yellow-footed flycatcher, Muscicapa sethsmithi
Spotted flycatcher, Muscicapa striata
Gambaga flycatcher, Muscicapa gambagae (A)
Swamp flycatcher, Muscicapa aquatica
Cassin's flycatcher, Muscicapa cassini
Sooty flycatcher, Bradornis infuscata
Dusky-blue flycatcher, Bradornis comitatus
African gray flycatcher, Bradornis microrhynchus
Pale flycatcher, Agricola pallidus
African forest-flycatcher, Fraseria ocreata
Gray-throated tit-flycatcher, Fraseria griseigularis
Gray tit-flycatcher, Fraseria plumbea
Chapin's flycatcher, Fraseria lendu
Ashy flycatcher, Fraseria caerulescens
Silverbird, Empidornis semipartitus
Yellow-eyed black-flycatcher, Melaenornis ardesiacus
Northern black-flycatcher, Melaenornis edolioides
Southern black-flycatcher, Melaenornis pammelaina
White-eyed slaty-flycatcher, Melaenornis fischeri
Fire-crested alethe, Alethe diademata
Forest scrub-robin, Cercotrichas leucosticta
Rufous-tailed scrub-robin, Cercotrichas galactotes (A)
Brown-backed scrub-robin, Cercotrichas hartlaubi
Red-backed scrub-robin, Cercotrichas leucophrys
White-bellied robin-chat, Cossyphicula roberti
Archer's robin-chat, Cossypha archeri
Cape robin-chat, Cossypha caffra
Blue-shouldered robin-chat, Cossypha cyanocampter
Gray-winged robin-chat, Cossypha polioptera
White-browed robin-chat, Cossypha heuglini
Red-capped robin-chat, Cossypha natalensis
Snowy-crowned robin-chat, Cossypha niveicapilla
Collared palm-thrush, Cichladusa arquata
Spotted morning-thrush, Cichladusa guttata
White-starred robin, Pogonocichla stellata
Brown-chested alethe, Chamaetylas poliocephala
Red-throated alethe, Chamaetylas poliophrys
Yellow-breasted forest robin, Stiphrornis mabirae
Lowland akalat, Sheppardia cyornithopsis
Equatorial akalat, Sheppardia aequatorialis
Thrush nightingale, Luscinia luscinia (A)
Common nightingale, Luscinia megarhynchos
Semicollared flycatcher, Ficedula semitorquata
European pied flycatcher, Ficedula hypoleuca
Collared flycatcher, Ficedula albicollis
Common redstart, Phoenicurus phoenicurus
Little rock-thrush, Monticola rufocinereus
Rufous-tailed rock-thrush, Monticola saxatilis
Miombo rock-thrush, Monticola angolensis
Whinchat, Saxicola rubetra
African stonechat, Saxicola torquatus
Moorland chat, Pinarochroa sordida
Mocking cliff-chat, Thamnolaea cinnamomeiventris
Sooty chat, Myrmecocichla nigra
Arnot's chat, Myrmecocichla arnotti
Northern wheatear, Oenanthe oenanthe
Capped wheatear, Oenanthe pileata (A)
Isabelline wheatear, Oenanthe isabellina
Heuglin's wheatear, Oenanthe heuglini
Desert wheatear, Oenanthe deserti
Pied wheatear, Oenanthe pleschanka
White-fronted black-chat, Oenanthe albifrons
Familiar chat, Oenanthe familiaris

Dapple-throat and allies
Order: PasseriformesFamily: Modulatricidae

This species and two others, all of different genera, were formerly placed in family Promeropidae, the sugarbirds, but were accorded their own family in 2017.

Gray-chested babbler, Kakamega poliothorax

Sunbirds and spiderhunters
Order: PasseriformesFamily: Nectariniidae

The sunbirds and spiderhunters are very small passerine birds which feed largely on nectar, although they will also take insects, especially when feeding young. Flight is fast and direct on their short wings. Most species can take nectar by hovering like a hummingbird, but usually perch to feed.

Fraser's sunbird, Deleornis fraseri
Gray-headed sunbird, Deleornis axillaris
Western violet-backed sunbird, Anthreptes longuemarei
Eastern violet-backed sunbird, Anthreptes orientalis
Little green sunbird, Anthreptes seimundi
Green sunbird, Anthreptes rectirostris
Collared sunbird, Hedydipna collaris
Pygmy sunbird, Hedydipna platura
Green-headed sunbird, Cyanomitra verticalis
Blue-throated brown sunbird, Cyanomitra cyanolaema
Blue-headed sunbird, Cyanomitra alinae
Olive sunbird, Cyanomitra olivacea
Green-throated sunbird, Chalcomitra rubescens
Amethyst sunbird, Chalcomitra amethystina
Scarlet-chested sunbird, Chalcomitra senegalensis
Purple-breasted sunbird, Nectarinia purpureiventris
Tacazze sunbird, Nectarinia tacazze
Bronze sunbird, Nectarinia kilimensis
Malachite sunbird, Nectarinia famosa
Red-tufted sunbird, Nectarinia johnstoni
Golden-winged sunbird, Drepanorhynchus reichenowi
Olive-bellied sunbird, Cinnyris chloropygius
Tiny sunbird, Cinnyris minullus
Stuhlmann's sunbird, Cinnyris stuhlmanni
Prigogine's sunbird, Cinnyris prigoginei
Northern double-collared sunbird, Cinnyris reichenowi
Greater double-collared sunbird, Cinnyris afer
Regal sunbird, Cinnyris regius
Beautiful sunbird, Cinnyris pulchellus
Mariqua sunbird, Cinnyris mariquensis
Red-chested sunbird, Cinnyris erythrocercus
Purple-banded sunbird, Cinnyris bifasciatus
Orange-tufted sunbird, Cinnyris bouvieri
Palestine sunbird, Cinnyris osea
Shining sunbird, Cinnyris habessinicus
Superb sunbird, Cinnyris superbus
Variable sunbird, Cinnyris venustus
Copper sunbird, Cinnyris cupreus

Weavers and allies
Order: PasseriformesFamily: Ploceidae

The weavers are small passerine birds related to the finches. They are seed-eating birds with rounded conical bills. The males of many species are brightly coloured, usually in red or yellow and black. Some species show variation in colour only in the breeding season.

White-billed buffalo-weaver, Bubalornis albirostris
Red-billed buffalo-weaver, Bubalornis niger
White-headed buffalo-weaver, Dinemellia dinemelli
Speckle-fronted weaver, Sporopipes frontalis
White-browed sparrow-weaver, Plocepasser mahali
Chestnut-crowned sparrow-weaver, Plocepasser superciliosus
Gray-headed social-weaver, Pseudonigrita arnaudi
Red-bellied malimbe, Malimbus erythrogaster
Blue-billed malimbe, Malimbus nitens
Crested malimbe, Malimbus malimbicus
Red-headed malimbe, Malimbus rubricollis
Red-headed weaver, Anaplectes rubriceps
Baglafecht weaver, Ploceus baglafecht
Little weaver, Ploceus luteolus
Slender-billed weaver, Ploceus pelzelni
Black-necked weaver, Ploceus nigricollis
Spectacled weaver, Ploceus ocularis
Black-billed weaver, Ploceus melanogaster
Strange weaver, Ploceus alienus
Holub's golden-weaver, Ploceus xanthops
Orange weaver, Ploceus aurantius
Northern brown-throated weaver, Ploceus castanops
Northern masked-weaver, Ploceus taeniopterus (A)
Lesser masked-weaver, Ploceus intermedius
Vitelline masked-weaver, Ploceus vitellinus
Heuglin's masked-weaver, Ploceus heuglini
Fox's weaver, Ploceus spekeoides (E)
Vieillot's black weaver, Ploceus nigerrimus
Village weaver, Ploceus cucullatus
Weyns's weaver, Ploceus weynsi
Black-headed weaver, Ploceus melanocephalus
Golden-backed weaver, Ploceus jacksoni
Chestnut weaver, Ploceus rubiginosus
Cinnamon weaver, Ploceus badius
Golden-naped weaver, Ploceus aureonucha (A)
Yellow-mantled weaver, Ploceus tricolor
Maxwell's black weaver, Ploceus albinucha
Forest weaver, Ploceus bicolor
Brown-capped weaver, Ploceus insignis
Compact weaver, Pachyphantes superciliosus
Cardinal quelea, Quelea cardinalis
Red-headed quelea, Quelea erythrops
Red-billed quelea, Quelea quelea
Northern red bishop, Euplectes franciscanus
Southern red bishop, Euplectes orix
Black-winged bishop, Euplectes hordeaceus
Black bishop, Euplectes gierowii
Yellow-crowned bishop, Euplectes afer
Yellow bishop, Euplectes capensis
White-winged widowbird, Euplectes albonotatus
Yellow-mantled widowbird, Euplectes macroura
Red-collared widowbird, Euplectes ardens
Red-cowled widowbird, Euplectes laticauda
Fan-tailed widowbird, Euplectes axillaris
Marsh widowbird, Euplectes hartlaubi
Grosbeak weaver, Amblyospiza albifrons

Waxbills and allies
Order: PasseriformesFamily: Estrildidae

The estrildid finches are small passerine birds of the Old World tropics and Australasia. They are gregarious and often colonial seed eaters with short thick but pointed bills. They are all similar in structure and habits, but have wide variation in plumage colours and patterns.

Gray-headed silverbill, Spermestes griseicapilla (A)
Bronze mannikin, Spermestes cucullatus
Magpie mannikin, Spermestes fringilloides
Black-and-white mannikin, Spermestes bicolor
African silverbill, Euodice cantans
White-collared oliveback, Nesocharis ansorgei
Yellow-bellied waxbill, Coccopygia quartinia
Green-backed twinspot, Mandingoa nitidula
Shelley's crimsonwing, Cryptospiza shelleyi
Dusky crimsonwing, Cryptospiza jacksoni
Abyssinian crimsonwing, Cryptospiza salvadorii
Red-faced crimsonwing, Cryptospiza reichenovii
Jameson's antpecker, Parmoptila jamesoni
White-breasted nigrita, Nigrita fusconota
Chestnut-breasted nigrita, Nigrita bicolor
Gray-headed nigrita, Nigrita canicapilla
Pale-fronted nigrita, Nigrita luteifrons
Gray-headed oliveback, Delacourella capistrata
Black-faced waxbill, Brunhilda erythronotos
Black-cheeked waxbill, Brunhilda charmosyna
Black-crowned waxbill, Estrilda nonnula
Kandt's waxbill, Estrilda kandti
Orange-cheeked waxbill, Estrilda melpoda (A)
Fawn-breasted waxbill, Estrilda paludicola
Common waxbill, Estrilda astrild
Black-rumped waxbill, Estrilda troglodytes
Crimson-rumped waxbill, Estrilda rhodopyga
Quailfinch, Ortygospiza atricollis
Cut-throat, Amadina fasciata
Zebra waxbill, Amandava subflava
Purple grenadier, Uraeginthus ianthinogaster
Red-cheeked cordonbleu, Uraeginthus bengalus
Grant's bluebill, Spermophaga poliogenys
Red-headed bluebill, Spermophaga ruficapilla
Black-bellied seedcracker, Pyrenestes ostrinus
Green-winged pytilia, Pytilia melba
Orange-winged pytilia, Pytilia afra
Red-winged pytilia, Pytilia phoenicoptera
Dybowski's twinspot, Euschistospiza dybowskii
Dusky twinspot, Euschistospiza cinereovinacea
Brown twinspot, Clytospiza monteiri
Red-billed firefinch, Lagonosticta senegala
African firefinch, Lagonosticta rubricata
Jameson's firefinch, Lagonosticta rhodopareia
Black-bellied firefinch, Lagonosticta rara
Bar-breasted firefinch, Lagonosticta rufopicta
Black-faced firefinch, Lagonosticta larvata

Indigobirds

Order: PasseriformesFamily: Viduidae

The indigobirds are finch-like species which usually have black or indigo predominating in their plumage. All are brood parasites which lay their eggs in the nests of estrildid finches.

Pin-tailed whydah, Vidua macroura
Broad-tailed paradise-whydah, Vidua obtusa (A)
Eastern paradise-whydah, Vidua paradisaea
Steel-blue whydah, Vidua hypocherina
Straw-tailed whydah, Vidua fischeri
Village indigobird, Vidua chalybeata
Wilson's indigobird, Vidua wilsoni
Parasitic weaver, Anomalospiza imberbis

Old World sparrows

Order: PasseriformesFamily: Passeridae

Sparrows are small passerine birds. In general, sparrows tend to be small, plump, brown or grey birds with short tails and short powerful beaks. Sparrows are seed eaters, but they also consume small insects.

House sparrow, Passer domesticus (I)
Shelley's rufous sparrow, Passer shelleyi
Northern gray-headed sparrow, Passer griseus
Parrot-billed sparrow, Passer gongonensis
Chestnut sparrow, Passer eminibey
Yellow-spotted bush sparrow, Gymnoris pyrgita
Sahel bush sparrow, Gymnoris dentata

Wagtails and pipits

Order: PasseriformesFamily: Motacillidae

Motacillidae is a family of small passerine birds with medium to long tails. They include the wagtails, longclaws, and pipits. They are slender ground-feeding insectivores of open country.

Cape wagtail, Motacilla capensis
Mountain wagtail, Motacilla clara
Gray wagtail, Motacilla cinerea
Western yellow wagtail, Motacilla flava
African pied wagtail, Motacilla aguimp
White wagtail, Motacilla alba
African pipit, Anthus cinnamomeus
Long-billed pipit, Anthus similis
Tawny pipit, Anthus campestris (A)
Plain-backed pipit, Anthus leucophrys
Striped pipit, Anthus lineiventris (A)
Tree pipit, Anthus trivialis
Red-throated pipit, Anthus cervinus
Short-tailed pipit, Anthus brachyurus
Golden pipit, Tmetothylacus tenellus (A)
Yellow-throated longclaw, Macronyx croceus

Finches, euphonias, and allies

Order: PasseriformesFamily: Fringillidae

Finches are seed-eating passerine birds, that are small to moderately large and have a strong beak, usually conical and in some species very large. All have twelve tail feathers and nine primaries. These birds have a bouncing flight with alternating bouts of flapping and gliding on closed wings, and most sing well.

Oriole finch, Linurgus olivaceus
White-rumped seedeater, Crithagra leucopygius
Yellow-fronted canary, Crithagra mozambicus
African citril, Crithagra citrinelloides (A)
Western citril, Crithagra frontalis
Southern citril, Crithagra hyposticta (A)
Papyrus canary, Crithagra koliensis
Black-throated canary, Crithagra atrogularis
Reichenow's seedeater, Crithagra reichenowi
White-bellied canary, Crithagra dorsostriatus
Brimstone canary, Crithagra sulphuratus
Streaky seedeater, Crithagra striolatus
Thick-billed seedeater, Crithagra burtoni
West African seedeater, Crithagra canicapilla
Reichard's seedeater, Crithagra reichardi
Yellow-crowned canary, Serinus flavivertes

Old World buntings
Order: PasseriformesFamily: Emberizidae

The emberizids are a large family of passerine birds. They are seed-eating birds with distinctively shaped bills. Many emberizid species have distinctive head patterns.

Brown-rumped bunting, Emberiza affinis
Ortolan bunting, Emberiza hortulana (A)
Cabanis's bunting, Emberiza cabanisi
Golden-breasted bunting, Emberiza flaviventris
Somali bunting, Emberiza poliopleura (A)
Cinnamon-breasted bunting, Emberiza tahapisi

References

See also
List of birds
Lists of birds by region
List of birds of Jinja

Uganda
Uganda
Birds
Uganda